Luke Williams (born 9 October 1980) is an English football coach and former non-league footballer. He is the current head coach of National League club Notts County.

Coaching career

Early career
Following a short career as a player in non-league, Luke Williams began coaching as an FA Skills Coach and moved on to the youth set-ups at grassroots football club Colebrook Royals in Chigwell, Essex, Leyton Orient and West Ham United. Williams later became a development coach at Brighton & Hove Albion where he managed the club's U21 and reserve sides for several years.

Swindon Town
In 2013, Williams was appointed assistant manager to Mark Cooper at League One club Swindon Town, and helped the team reach the 2015 play-offs before losing to Preston North End in the final. Following Cooper's departure from Swindon early the following season, Williams worked as assistant to caretaker manager-chairman, Lee Power, and Cooper's eventual replacement Martin Ling. On 30 December 2015, he was appointed caretaker manager following Ling's sudden resignation. On 21 January 2016, Williams was appointed permanent manager of Swindon Town until the end of the 2015–16 season. He was appointed as head coach on a permanent basis on 9 March 2016, signing a 5-year contract, after winning 6 of his 10 games in charge as interim manager. On 5 May 2017, it was announced Williams had left Swindon by mutual agreement following the club's relegation to League Two at the end of the 2016–17 season.

Bristol City
Following his departure, Williams was appointed as head coach of Championship club Bristol City's U23 side on 29 June 2017.

Milton Keynes Dons
On 14 November 2019, Williams joined League One club Milton Keynes Dons as assistant manager to newly-appointed Russell Martin.

Swansea City
On 1 August 2021, Williams joined Championship club Swansea City as assistant head coach, following Russell Martin to the club. On 18 February 2022, Williams left the club.

Notts County
On 14 June 2022, Williams joined National League club Notts County as Head Coach. Williams was awarded the National League Manager of the Month award for October 2022, winning all six matches across the month as they sat top of the league.

Managerial statistics

Honours
Individual
National League Manager of the Month: October 2022

References 

Living people
1980 births
Ashford Town (Middlesex) F.C. players
Bishop's Stortford F.C. players
Tunbridge Wells F.C. players
Tonbridge Angels F.C. players
Isthmian League players
Association footballers not categorized by position
English footballers
English football managers
Brighton & Hove Albion F.C. non-playing staff
Swindon Town F.C. non-playing staff
Swindon Town F.C. managers
Milton Keynes Dons F.C. non-playing staff
Bristol City F.C. non-playing staff
Swansea City A.F.C. non-playing staff
Notts County F.C. managers
English Football League managers
National League (English football) managers
Leyton Orient F.C. non-playing staff
West Ham United F.C. non-playing staff